Barbary Coast is an American television series that aired on ABC. The pilot film first aired on May 4, 1975 and the series itself premiered September 8, 1975; the last episode aired January 9, 1976.

Synopsis

Barbary Coast features the adventures of 19th century government agent Jeff Cable (played by William Shatner), and his pal, conman and gambler Cash ("Cash makes no enemies") Conover (Doug McClure; played by Dennis Cole in the pilot) who is the owner of the Golden Gate Casino. This was Shatner's first live-action series since Star Trek (also produced by Paramount Television).

In their battle against various criminals and foreign spies, Cable and Conover operated out of the latter's saloon and casino located on San Francisco's notorious Barbary Coast neighborhood which featured casinos, prostitution and high rates of crime. Like Wild Wild West's Artemus Gordon, Cable frequently donned disguises in the course of his investigations.

Other regulars on the series included recurring Wild Wild West villain actor Richard Kiel as Moose Moran and Dave Turner as Thumbs.

Episodes

Awards and nominations
The pilot episode, an ABC Sunday Night Movie, was nominated for an Emmy Award for Art Direction for Jack De Shields and set decorator Reg Allen.

Cultural references

The Mad Magazine Star Trek musical satire "Keep on Trekkin'" (1976) depicts William Shatner as Captain James T. Kirk on the bridge of the U.S.S. Enterprise singing a version of "Send in the Clowns" that includes the lyric "Look at me now/At my old post/Happy that I can forget Barbary Coast!"

References

External links
  (television movie)
 

American television films
Television series by CBS Studios
American Broadcasting Company original programming
1975 American television series debuts
1976 American television series endings
1970s Western (genre) television series
Espionage television series
1975 television films
1975 films
English-language television shows
Barbary Coast, San Francisco
Television series set in the 19th century
Television shows set in San Francisco